Arunachala Kavi (1711–1779) was a Tamil poet and a composer of Carnatic music. He was born in Tillaiyadi in Thanjavur District in Tamil Nadu. The three Tamil composers Arunachala Kavi, Muthu Thandavar and Marimutthu Pillai are considered the Tamil Trinity, who contributed to the evolution of Carnatic music.

Life
His father died when he was 12, and during that time he went to Dharmapuram Mutt to continue his studies in Sanskrit and Tamil. The head of Mutt was so pleased with him he even considered making Arunchala his successor. At 18, he left Mutt and continued his studies in Tamil for another 12 years.

He got married at the age of 30 in a place called Karuppur and earned his livelihood by setting up a jeweller's shop.

He wanted to buy gold at a cheaper rate, therefore he travelled to Pondicherry. On his way, he stopped at Seerkazhi, and found a branch of Dharmapuram Mutt. The head was his old colleague, Chidambaram. Chidamabaram convinced him to do a Prabandham, then convinced him and his family to settle in Seerkaazhi. Therefore, he got the name Seerkaazhi AruNaachala Kavi. He then wanted to do an arangetram in a temple, but the temple priests denied him permission unless the Lord himself gave it. So  during the night,  Lord Ranganaatha appeared and let him do it.

Thus came it about that AruNaachala Kaviraayar's Raama Naatakam, composed in a series of lyrics, drew wide attention. The lyrics set in Carnaatic raagaas have become immensely popular.

Arunaachala Kaviraayar died in 1779 at the age of 68.

Compositions
Arunachala Kavi was fluent in Tamil, Telugu and Sanskrit. He wrote Rama Natakam, a musical drama based on the Ramayana. The music for this musical was composed by two of Arunachala Kavi's disciples, Kothandarama Iyer and Venkatarama Iyer. The songs contain many Tamil proverbs and sayings.

This musical drama was first performed at the Srirangam temple and within a short time it became very popular. Kavirayar was honoured by Maharaja Tulaja, the King of Tanjavur, and by several other patrons of that time. He also composed Seergazhi Sthala Puranam (Sirkali), Seergazhi Kovai, Hanumar Pillai Tamil, Ajomukhi Natakam and a few Keertanas.

Some of his famous compositions still popular today are  Enpalli kondir iyya, Yaro ivar yaro (Bhairavi), Kanden Kanden Sitayai (Vasantha), Ramanai Kannara Kandane (Mohanam).

See also 

 List of Carnatic composers

References

 M. V. Ramana, Pre-trinity composers of Tamil Nadu, Carnatica.net
Lena Tamilvanan (ed.), (in Tamil) Thamizh Mummanikalin kiirththanaikal, Manimekalai Publications, Chennai 600 017, 1987 (லேனா தமிழ்வானன் (பதிபாசிரியர்), தமிழ் மும்மணிகளின் கீர்த்தனைகள், மணிமேகலைப் பிரசுரம், சென்னை 600 017, முதற்பதிப்பு 1987).

1711 births
1779 deaths
Carnatic composers
People from Thanjavur district
18th-century classical composers
18th-century male musicians